Steven Toushin (born August 6, 1946, in Brooklyn, NY) is an American producer and distributor of gay pornographic and BDSM films who has operated adult theaters and sex clubs since 1970.  Toushin owned and managed the Bijou Theater in Chicago, the oldest gay adult theater and sex club in the United States and www.bijouworld.com. Toushin has produced multiple underground and classic pornographic films and published several books on the matter. He has been a defendant in the United States justice system continuously from 1969 until the present; he has defended himself and his companies in twenty-one obscenity cases including two federal obscenity trials; and has suffered thirty-five personal arrests and over 200 busts to his businesses.

Career

Steven Toushin was born and raised in Brooklyn, New York. He left New York in 1963 at the age of 18, on his bicycle and traveled to Montreal to see Marlene Dietrich at Expo. During the next two years he traveled and worked at odd jobs digging graves, short order cook, picking potatoes, cutting pulp wood throughout New England. Steven left New England in the summer of 1968 landing in Chicago, where he got a job managing the Aardvark Theater in Pipers Alley that showed 16mm underground experimental art and documentary films. This was the beginning of his unusual career.

The Aardvark's screening policy was not a successful endeavor and to sustain itself turned to screening art films that displayed nudity from time to time to turn a profit. In 1970 Toushin and partners presented at the Aardvark the first hardcore film to be released commercially in the U.S, Alex DeRenzy's "Pornography in Denmark" at that point the Aardvark became a porn theater. Later that year Toushin and his partners opened other theaters and sex clubs throughout Chicago, San Francisco, Indianapolis, East Chicago and Gary, Indiana, including the Festival Chicago, Festival Indianapolis, Termite, 3-Penny, Eden, Savages, and Bijou Theaters.  Of these only the Bijou remained open until late 2015.

Toushin's first arrest for obscenity occurred in 1969 for screening the underground classic film Flaming Creatures by Jack Smith. Obscenity charges were brought under Illinois state law. In 1970 similar charges were brought for screening I Am Curious (Yellow) in Indianapolis, in 1973 for Deep Throat and in 1974 for Teenage Fantasies. The case resulting from the 1974 arrest was dismissed after a two-week jury trial: Toushin also defended himself in two federal obscenity suits regarding BDSM . His first federal obscenity trial occurred in 1973 for screening Ranch Slaves. His last obscenity bust was in 1991 for the Film "More of a Man".

In 1987, several of his Slave and Master films were indicted on federal obscenity charges in Tennessee, Utah and Nebraska as a result of
Attorney General Meese's Commission on Pornography. This resulted in an extraordinary SM trial that included many well-known people from the Leather community. Steven's book, The Destruction of the Moral Fabric of America, is centered on this trial. The last police raid on his business was in 1996 and his last federal trial (second trial for tax's stemming from 1980 to 1982) was in 1998.

Toushin has flourished longer than anyone else in the adult industry despite 35 arrests (personally), and 200 busts to his businesses that included 21 obscenity trials, five federal trials, three federal appeals (winning two) and numerous state and local trials. Toushin has been incarcerated twice (1988 and 1996) spending three years in federal prison for being in his chosen profession.

Toushin is still the owner of the Bijou Theater (1970) the oldest gay theatre/sex club in the U.S., and Bijou Video a gay adult mail order company (1978). Over all his businesses have included theaters, sex clubs, gay bathhouses, massage parlors (prostitution), and adult bookstores in Chicago, San Francisco, Indianapolis, and East Chicago. Toushin made and produced both gay and straight adult films from 1971 to 1996 as well as S/M films in the 1970s and Slave & Master films in the early 1980s. With the advent of video Toushin became a major distributor of gay pornographic and S/M films until 1995. Toushin published The Bijou Video Catalog which many called the bible of gay video from 1980 to 1995.

In 1987 he made a censorship commercial that was put on 70% of all sex tapes till 1993. He has written for several weekly gay magazines, and has authored four books, The Puppy Papers, Puppy's Tales, The Destruction of the Moral Fabric of America, and the Bijou Cock Coloring Book.

In 1989 at the Adult Video Awards show in Las Vegas Toushin received (while he was in prison) the Reuben Sturman Award  “For Legal Battles on Behalf of the Adult Industry. In 2007 at the GayVN award show in San Francisco, Toushin was awarded the “Life Time Achievement Award” from the Gay Adult Industry. He is the 3rd person to ever receive this honor. In the June 2008 AVN (Adult Video News) magazine's 25th anniversary edition Toushin was acknowledged as one of the 25 pioneers who developed the Gay/bi Adult Film Industry. In January 2009 at the AVN award show in Las Vegas Toushin was inducted into the prestigious Founders Branch. This award recognized Toushin's (starting in 1969) contribution as a major player in developing the modern Adult Industry.

In Dec 2007 Mr. Toushin was elected to the board of the Free Speech Coalition an organization that represents the Adult Industry. In January 2009 Mr. Toushin holds the distinction of being the first person to be voted off the Board of the FSC. Toushin felt the FSC did not represent the needs and interests of the current Adult Industry. So he created an outline for establishing an organization for business owners and sent out the proposal to select members of the Adult Industry. His proposal included a code of ethics, mission, vision and philosophy for establishing an organization that would best represent the interests of the modern adult industry in the U.S.. This did not sit well with the FSC.

1989 federal obscenity trial

Toushin's second federal obscenity suit began in July 1988 when grand juries in Tennessee and Utah indicted him for the distribution of Erotic Hands, The Final Chapter of Mistress Ann, You Said a Mouthful, and Please Sir, films that depict extremely brutal and degrading S/M scenes.  Nonetheless, Toushin argued that his BDSM films were not legally obscene. At the time of indictment, the U.S. government was conducting a third investigation in Nebraska and an indictment there followed. All three investigations were the product of a federal program named “Operation PostPorn” which comprised a nationwide federal investigation spanning 9 U.S. cities and led to the indictment of 20 people and 14 corporations including Toushin and his companies.

The U.S. government sought indictments for "obscenity by the standards of a local community" by ordering U.S. Postal Inspectors in Tennessee, Utah, and Nebraska to order catalogs and magazines from Toushin's businesses located in Chicago, IL. Tennessee District Judge John T. Nixon stated that “there is no established evidence that the films involved in this case have ever been sent to the jurisdiction by defendants except for those copies ordered by the Government.” Toushin asked the Tennessee court to transfer his case to Northern Illinois but Judge Nixon refused, stating that the appropriate finder of fact is a jury selected from the community in which the offense took place and that such a transfer should only be granted when there is “intentional overreaching” by the government.  Nixon found that “although the Government took measures inducing the defendants to mail allegedly obscene materials to Middle Tennessee, the defendants made a deliberate decision to conduct business here [by mailing the materials].” (see Miller test)

Toushin defended himself from federal obscenity charges by arguing that his films were “ violent” and did not appeal to a prurient, sick, shameful, morbid or unhealthy interest in sex. He brought expert witnesses to testify that average members of the BDSM community would not have a prurient interest in these films. The experts were psychotherapist Guy Baldwin, Dr. Robert Stoller, Dr. Richard Green, anthropologist Professor Gregerson, gay S/M activists Gayle Rubin, Jim Ward, Geoff Mains, Tony DeBlase, Dr. Andrew Charles, John Rowberry and Barry Douglas from GMSMA. He also argued that the material had scientific value as the films offer insight into violent psychological dispositions or an unhealthy interest in violence. Toushin's attorneys stated that the films present a problem in that they may appeal to an unhealthy interest in violence.  However, to convict Toushin for distributing extremely violent films would be a misuse of obscenity law.

Judge Nixon had consistently demonstrated his displeasure with the U.S. Government for “attempt[ing] to fabricate venue.”  Within 2 hours of the jury exiting the courtroom for deliberation, the U.S. Government approached Toushin's attorneys and offered to settle the case. Toushin pleaded guilty to one count of conspiring to use the U.S. mails to distribute obscene material and the U.S. government agreed to drop proceedings in Utah and Nebraska and to appoint Judge Nixon as the sentencing judge.  In August 1989, Judge Nixon ordered Toushin to serve five years probation and fined Toushin's two businesses $250,000 each. The four movies at issue were never confiscated and the U.S. Government did not ask the court to enjoin against their future distribution.

Production filmography

Films by Davis Babbitt
Find This Man
Hey Tony! What's the Story?
Films of Butch Detroit
Chicago Meat Packers
Deep in the Woods
Don't Ask, Don't Tell
Gorgeous
Major Owns
Moon Over Bangkok
The New Marines
One Night in Hell
Real Man Wouldn't Leave
True Blue
Films by Toby Ross
Baby It's You
Classmates
Men of Touch Guys (hd. Core)
Mr. Wonderful
Once in a Blue Moon
Sexy Billy Blue
Tough Guys Do Dance
Classic Bijou Hits
Two Handfuls I

Publications

The Destruction of the Moral Fabric of America by Steven Toushin: Toushin recounts the story of his 1989 federal obscenity trial in Nashville, Tennessee.  Interwoven into his discussion of modern obscenity law are his observations while in prison, his proposal for certifying "masters, mistresses, slaves, and pro-dommes", a chapter on Jeffrey Dahmer, who killed one of Toushin's employees, and Toushin's theory on BDSM and the sexual future.
The Puppy Papers by Steven Toushin and Puppy Sharon: The Puppy Papers is based on the true story of a women's search for her "master" in BDSM.
Puppy Tales by Steven Toushin and Puppy Sharon is the continuation of Steven Toushin and Puppy Sharon's BDSM relationship.
The Cock Coloring Book by Steven Toushin.

Awards

2009: Inducted into Founders Branch of the Adult Video News Hall of Fame at the AVN Award Show in Las Vegas, Nev.  Other Founders include Phil Harvey and Larry Flynt.
2008: Named one of 25 Pioneers to develop the gay/bisexual adult film industry in the AVN Magazine's 25th anniversary edition.
2007: Lifetime Achievement Award at the GayVN Award Show in San Francisco, CA.
1989: Reuben Sturman Award “for legal battles on behalf of the adult industry” at the AVN Award Show in Las Vegas, Nevada.

External links
AVN Media Network articles about Steven Toushin
(http://www.bijouworld.com)
(http://www.bijoutheaterchicago.com)]

References

Bondage pornography
1946 births
Living people